Squash, for the 2013 Bolivarian Games, took place from 23 November to 29 November 2013.

Medal table
Key:

Medalists

References

Events at the 2013 Bolivarian Games
2013 in squash
2013 Bolivarian Games